The Erich-Weinert-Ensemble was a professional army ensemble of the National People's Army of the German Democratic Republic. The ensemble consisted of a male choir, a ballet, an orchestra, a cabaret, soloists, dramaturges, conductors, directors, choreographers and technical and organizational staff. The ensemble was based in Berlin-Biesdorf. The ensemble was named after Erich Weinert, a German communist writer.

History
On 15 July 1950, a folk art ensemble was set up by Kasernierte Volkspolizei. It was handed over to the NVA in 1956, where it was renamed the Erich-Weinert-Ensemble.

The ensemble made a name for itself both locally and internationally due to the diversity of its repertoire, the cultivation of the traditions of the German folk song and propagandistic songs. The ensemble toured the People's Republic of China and the Soviet Union.

In 1989, the ensemble was transferred to the Bundeswehr and was spun off on June 30, 1991, by order of the German Bundestag. The ensemble was financed by the Federal Defense Ministry of Germany until 1994.

References

East German musical groups
German military bands
Musical groups established in 1950
1950 establishments in East Germany
National People's Army